Filatima tephrinopa is a moth of the family Gelechiidae. It is found in North America, where it has been recorded from Texas.

The wingspan is 15–17 mm. The forewings are rather dark grey, more or less irrorated black, sometimes some slight scattered black marks, in one example a short line black longitudinal streak from just beneath the apex. The discal stigmata form small indistinct blackish-grey spots obscurely ringed or partly edged whitish-grey, the first roundish or somewhat elongate, the second smaller, some dark suffusion or marking between and before them, the plical forming an elongate mark. The hindwings are grey.

References

Moths described in 1929
Filatima